Bluewater Village is a census-designated place in Cibola County, New Mexico, United States. Its population in 2010 was 628.

Demographics

Description

Bluewater Village is west of Grants. The Bluewater Elementary School is located here. The Bluewater post office, which is included in the CDP, has a ZIP code of 87005.

There was formerly a Navajo community at this location, and the area was called Agua Azul. The town was founded in 1880 as a stop on the A&P Railroad. Several Mormon settlers built an earthen dam and established a community nearby in 1896 named Mormontown. The railroad town faded, and Mormontown adopted the name Bluewater.

Nearby was the former Bluewater Mill, a uranium mill operated by Anaconda Copper from 1954 to 1982. The site was reclaimed in 1995, under the provisions of the Uranium Mill Tailings Radiation Control Act, and is monitored by the U.S. Department of Energy.

See also

 List of census-designated places in New Mexico

References

External links

 Bluewater Mill and tailings impoundment site
 Aerial photo of Bluewater Mill, 1971

Census-designated places in Cibola County, New Mexico
Census-designated places in New Mexico